is a Japanese football player. He plays for Verspah Oita.

Club statistics

References

External links

J. League (#27)

1989 births
Living people
Fukuyama University alumni
Association football people from Shimane Prefecture
Japanese footballers
J2 League players
J3 League players
Japan Football League players
FC Gifu players
FC Machida Zelvia players
Vonds Ichihara players
Verspah Oita players
Association football forwards